2014 W-League grand final can refer to:

 2014 W-League grand final (February), played as part of the 2013–14 W-League season between Brisbane Roar FC and Melbourne Victory FC
 2014 W-League grand final (December), played as part of the 2014 W-League season between Canberra United FC and Perth Glory FC